About may refer to:

 About (surname)
 About.com, an online source for original information and advice
 about.me, a personal web hosting service
 abOUT, a Canadian LGBT online magazine
 About Magazine, a Texas-based digital platform covering LGBT news 
 About URI scheme, an internal URI scheme
 About box, a dialog box that displays information related to a computer software
 About equal sign, symbol used to indicate values are approximately equal

See also
 About Face (disambiguation)
 About Last Night (disambiguation)
 About Time (disambiguation)
 About us (disambiguation)
 About You (disambiguation)
 about to, one of the future constructions in English grammar